is a single released by Gackt on February 7, 2007 under Nippon Crown. It peaked at third place on the Oricon weekly chart and charted for eleven weeks.

Overview 
The song, translated "Like a Wild Flower", was first performed on February 28, 2006, when Gackt appeared at the graduation of the Maiko High School in Hyōgo Prefecture, because of a promise he gave to a student. He received a letter by student who was worried that his school's department would shut down due to lack of student interest. Their division managed to survive and Gackt wrote the song and performed it at that year's graduation ceremony in honor of their perseverance. Since then he continued to make surprise appearances in high school graduation ceremonies, where encourage students to follow their dreams, and performs the song.

Track listing

References 

2007 singles
Gackt songs
2007 songs
Songs written by Gackt
Minna no Uta